Della Russel Ocloo is a Ghanaian journalist, communications and media personality. Della is currently the reporter at Graphic Communications Limited in the Tema Municipality. She was also a convenor of a demonstration against the Nana Akufo-Addo's government named the 'FixTheCountry'.

Career in journalism 
She is the Tema regional reporter for the Daily Graphic.

Assault 
In August 2019, she was assaulted by some members of Glorious Wave International Church at Sakumono for reporting on a protest that was conducted against Badu Kobi, the church's pastor. She was threatened during the coverage. The police was later called and she got arrested. She was asked to delete the images she took of the scene on the activities of the church.

Personal life 
Della Russell is married.

Honours and awards 
In June 2018, she won the 'Reporter of the Year' in the Ghana Shippers Awards that was organized by the Ministry of Transport, the Globe Productions, Graphic Communications Group and the Ghana Shippers Authority.

References 

Living people
Ghanaian women journalists
Ghanaian journalists
Year of birth missing (living people)